Jonathan Chu, John Chu, or variation, may refer to:

 Jonathan Chu (tennis) (born 1983), American professional tennis player
 Jon M. Chu (full name: Jonathan Murray Chu), an American film director and screenwriter
 John Chu, an American science fiction writer
 Jonathan Chu, a violinist formerly in the Christian rock band Skillet
 John Chu Nai-cheung, Director of Audit (Hong Kong)

See also
 Chu (disambiguation)
 Jon (disambiguation)
 John (disambiguation)
 Jonathan (disambiguation)